The 2022 FIFA World Cup final was the final match of the 2022 FIFA World Cup, the 22nd edition of FIFA's competition for men's national football teams. The match was played at Lusail Stadium in Lusail, Qatar, on 18 December 2022, the Qatari National Day, and was contested by Argentina and defending champions France. The tournament comprised hosts Qatar and 31 other teams who emerged from the qualification phase, organised by the six FIFA confederations. The 32 teams competed in a group stage, from which 16 teams qualified for the knockout stage. En route to the final, Argentina finished first in Group C, with two wins and one loss, before defeating Australia in the round of 16, the Netherlands in the quarter-final through a penalty shoot-out and Croatia in the semi-final. France finished top of Group D with two wins and one loss, defeating Poland in the round of 16, England in the quarter-final and Morocco in the semi-final. The final took place in front of 88,966 spectators, with more than 1.5 billion people watching on television, and was refereed by Szymon Marciniak.

Argentina took the lead through a penalty by Lionel Messi in the 23rd minute before Ángel Di María further increased their lead in the 36th minute with a low shot into the corner of the goal after a sweeping Argentina counterattack. France failed to register a shot on goal for the vast majority of the match until a 97-second brace by Kylian Mbappé tied the game 2-2 in the 81st minute. During extra time, Messi then scored again to give Argentina a 3–2 lead. However, Mbappé scored another penalty to tie the game 3-3 with only minutes remaining, becoming the second man to score a hat-trick in a World Cup final, after Geoff Hurst in 1966. Argentina then won the ensuing penalty shoot-out 4–2 to win their third World Cup, and first since 1986.

Argentina became the second team after Spain in 2010 to win the World Cup after losing their opening game. France became the first team to score three goals in a World Cup final and lose. Messi was named the man of the match, and won the Golden Ball as FIFA's best player of the tournament. The match was widely praised and regarded as one of the greatest World Cup finals of all time, and one of the greatest matches in the history of the sport.

Background
Argentina had won the World Cup twice before, in 1978 and 1986. They had also finished as losing finalists thrice, in 1930, 1990 and 2014. After the 2014 final loss, they went on to lose two consecutive Copa América finals to Chile, in 2015 and 2016. After a string of disappointing performances in the 2018 FIFA World Cup, where they lost to eventual champions France in the first knockout round, and the 2019 Copa América, where they finished third, newly-appointed coach Lionel Scaloni led Argentina to their first international title since the 1993 Copa América: Argentina defeated Brazil 1–0 in the 2021 Copa América Final, handing captain Lionel Messi his first international title with Argentina. After winning the 2022 Finalissima, beating European champions Italy 3–0, Argentina entered Qatar as one of the favourites to win.

France were the defending champions from the 2018 World Cup, which made this the first time since the 2002 final in which a team had consecutive appearances at the finals, and the first since 1998 in which the title holders qualified for the subsequent final – both feats achieved by Brazil. France had claimed two World Cups, in 1998 and 2018. The French also reached the 2006 final, but fell to Italy on penalties. Under the management of Didier Deschamps, who won the 1998 tournament as a player, the French failed to conquer the 2014 World Cup and UEFA Euros 2016 and 2020, but successfully clinched the 2018 World Cup title. Due to their status as the world champions, France also entered Qatar as one of the favourites to win. France aimed to emulate the achievement of Italy in 1934 and 1938 and Brazil in 1958 and 1962 as the third country to successfully defend the World Cup title. Deschamps was seeking to become the second manager to win two mens' FIFA World Cup titles, after Vittorio Pozzo with Italy in 1934 and 1938. Having won the 1998 tournament as a player, Deschamps was also seeking to become the third person to win three FIFA World Cup titles, after Brazilian legends Pelé (all as a player) and Mário Zagallo (two as a player, one as a manager).

The two nations met in the knockout stage for the second straight World Cup. In 2018 in Russia at the Kazan Arena in the round of 16, France won the encounter 4–3 in what The Independent called "one of the greatest World Cup games of all time". Antoine Griezmann opened the scoring with a penalty before Ángel Di María and Gabriel Mercado put Argentina in front, with France then scoring the next three goals courtesy of Benjamin Pavard's volley outside of the box – which was later voted as the goal of the tournament – and then Kylian Mbappé twice. Sergio Agüero reduced the deficit to one in stoppage time, but Argentina was unable to equalise and send the match to extra time.

The match ball for the 2022 FIFA World Cup semi-finals, third place match and final was announced on 11 December 2022. It was a variation of the Adidas Al Rihla used in the rest of the tournament named the Adidas Al-Hilm, meaning "The Dream" in Arabic, a reference to every nation's dream of lifting the FIFA World Cup. Whilst the technical aspects of the ball are the same, the colour is different from the Al-Rihla balls used in the group stages and preceding knockout games, with a Gold Metallic, maroon, Collegiate Burgundy, and red design, a reference to the national colours of host nation Qatar and the golden colours shared by the final's venue Lusail Stadium and the FIFA World Cup Trophy. It is the fifth special ball for FIFA World Cup final matches, after the +Teamgeist Berlin, Jo'bulani, Brazuca Final Rio, and Telstar Mechta.

Venue

The stadium was intended to host the final as part of Qatar's World Cup bid, and was confirmed as the final venue on 15 July 2020. The stadium was allocated to also host nine previous World Cup matches, with six in the group stage and three other knockout fixtures.

Lusail Stadium, owned by the Qatar Football Association, was built as part of Qatar's winning bid for the World Cup. The stadium was designed by British firm Foster and Partners and Populous, supported by MANICA Architecture. The stadium uses solar power to be cooled and is claimed to have a carbon zero footprint. Construction began in April 2017, and was planned to finish in 2020. Completion of the stadium was postponed, with construction ultimately finished in November 2021. The stadium hosted its first match, the Lusail Super Cup, on 9 September 2022, later than expected.

Route to the final

Argentina

Drawn in group C and coming off a three-year, 36-game-long unbeaten streak, Argentina were defeated in their opening game 2–1 by Saudi Arabia. Lionel Messi's opener from the penalty spot was followed by several disallowed Argentina goals which were ruled offside. Immediately after half-time, Saudi Arabia stunned Argentina with two goals from Saleh Al-Shehri and Salem Al-Dawsari in a span of five minutes before shutting out any further attempts by the South Americans in a disciplined defensive performance. However, the Argentines bounced back from the shock loss to overcome Mexico 2–0 after a long-range effort by Messi who then assisted Enzo Fernández for the second, reigniting their World Cup hopes. Boosted by the win, Argentina then beat Poland with the same scoreline with goals from Alexis Mac Allister and Julián Álvarez despite a first-half penalty miss from Messi, taking first place in Group C and condemning both Mexico and Saudi Arabia to World Cup elimination.

In the round of 16, the Argentines found themselves matched against group D runners-up Australia; Messi's first-ever knockout-stage goal was followed by an astute goal by Álvarez, who intercepted Australian goalkeeper Mathew Ryan to finish into an empty net as Argentina overcame Australia 2–1, despite an own goal from Fernández creating a frantic finish which required a late save from point-blank range by Emiliano Martínez. Continuing a rivalry, they proceed to square off against the Netherlands in the quarter-finals. In a controversial match noted for its dramatic nature, chaotic atmosphere, and fury between both teams,  it saw Argentina lead by two goals coming from Nahuel Molina and a penalty from Messi, but succumbed to two late goals by Wout Weghorst as regulation time ended 2–2 after 90 minutes; neither could find the breakthrough in extra time and penalties were used to decide the winner. Emiliano Martínez saved the first two Dutch penalties from Virgil van Dijk and Steven Berghuis, while only Fernández missed for Argentina as Lautaro Martínez scored the decisive last kick of the game, a result reminiscent of their 2014 most recent, also knockout stage meeting and sending them through the semi-finals, as they meet 2018 runners up Croatia.  In a rematch of the 2018 encounter when Croatia had won 3–0, Argentina decisively beat Croatia by the same scoreline. Lionel Messi scored a first-half penalty before Álvarez scored a solo effort five minutes later. Messi then assisted Álvarez for his double in the second half, as Argentina booked their place in the final for the second time in eight years.

France

France started their World Cup campaign as the defending world champions, having won the most recent tournament in Russia, and was drawn in group D. Their first meeting was against AFC representative Australia. The French suffered a shock deficit after nine minutes due to a goal by Craig Goodwin, but were able to stage a comeback with a double from Olivier Giroud together with goals from Adrien Rabiot and Kylian Mbappé to win 4–1. Empowered by the win, France overcame a highly organised and threatening Denmark side with Mbappé striking twice in the second half, despite conceding an equaliser from Andreas Christensen. France won 2–1 and became the first team to progress to the knockout stage of the World Cup in Qatar and the first European world champions to do so since 1994. With progression assured, France rotated most of their team, resting their key players for the final game against a desperate Tunisia; France resultantly lost 1–0 courtesy of a goal by French-born Wahbi Khazri before having an equaliser by Antoine Griezmann disallowed. France maintained top of the group due to a superior goal difference over Australia.

In the round of 16, France overcame group C runners-up Poland 3–1 with goals from Giroud and Mbappé, despite conceding a late penalty from Robert Lewandowski. The quarter-finals saw France battling old rivals England in a tense match, with France defeating England 2–1 with goals from Aurélien Tchouaméni and Giroud; England found an equaliser for 1–1 courtesy of a penalty by Harry Kane but a second penalty to equalise the game was missed by Kane, granting France a place in the semi-finals. France then faced the biggest underdog of the tournament, Morocco, who had beaten both Iberian representatives Spain and Portugal in the process; the French were able to end the history-making run by the African nation with two goals from Théo Hernandez and Randal Kolo Muani. France reached their second consecutive World Cup final for the first time in their history.

Pre-match

Polish referee Szymon Marciniak was named as the referee of the final on 15 December 2022, with fellow Poles Paweł Sokolnicki and Tomasz Listkiewicz appointed as assistant referees. Marciniak became a FIFA referee in 2011 and had previously served as a referee at the UEFA Euro 2016 and 2018 FIFA World Cup, as well as during the 2018 UEFA Super Cup. Earlier in the tournament, Marciniak officiated the France–Denmark group stage game, as well as the Argentina–Australia match in the round of 16. It was the first time that a Polish referee led the team of officials at a World Cup final, and the second time that a Polish referee was included among the officials during such a match, after Michał Listkiewicz (father of Marciniak's assistant Tomasz) served as a linesman during the 1990 FIFA World Cup final.

Ismail Elfath and Kathryn Nesbitt of the United States were appointed as fourth official and reserve assistant referee, respectively, while another Pole, Tomasz Kwiatkowski, led the video assistant referee team. Venezuelan Juan Soto served as assistant video assistant referee, American Kyle Atkins was the offside video assistant referee, and the role of support video assistant referee was assigned to Mexican Fernando Guerrero. German Bastian Dankert and American Corey Parker served as stand-by video assistant referee and stand-by assistant video assistant referee, respectively.

Several heads of state were in attendance, among them Qatari Emir Tamim bin Hamad Al Thani, Turkish president Recep Tayyip Erdoğan, and French president Emmanuel Macron. Various members of the FIFA Council and FIFA president Gianni Infantino were also in attendance. Argentine head of state Alberto Fernández did not attend after having reportedly refused to travel to Qatar due to potential political backlash. However, Chiqui Tapia, the President of the Argentine Football Association was present in the final. 

The tournament's closing ceremony was held prior to the start of the match; it featured a collaboration between Puerto Rican singer Ozuna and French rapper Gims. Also performing were Nora Fatehi, Balqees, Rahma Riad and Manal.

The winners trophy was unveiled by World Cup winning captain Iker Casillas and Indian actress Deepika Padukone.

Argentine singer Lali Espósito sang the "Argentine National Anthem" and Egyptian mezzo-soprano Farrah Eldibany sang the French national anthem, "La Marseillaise", before the match.

Match

Summary

France kicked off the match at 18:00 local time (15:00 UTC) in front of a crowd of 88,966. Argentina were awarded a penalty in the 23rd minute when Ángel Di María was fouled in the penalty area by Ousmane Dembélé as Di María cut in from the left. Lionel Messi scored the penalty with a low shot to the right corner. In the 36th minute, Di Maria finished a sweeping Argentina counter-attack to make it 2–0, shooting with his left foot over the goalkeeper to the right corner of the net after a pass from Alexis Mac Allister from the right. France made two early substitutions near the end of the first half and went into half-time trailing 0–2. Argentina were on course for the win, controlling possession, and defensively shutting down France (who failed to make an attempt on goal), until the 80th minute, at which point France was awarded a penalty after Randal Kolo Muani was brought down in the penalty area by Nicolás Otamendi. Kylian Mbappé scored the penalty low to the left corner, despite Emiliano Martinéz getting a hand on the ball. 97 seconds later, Kingsley Coman tackled Messi right as the game restarted, starting a rapid counterattack which finished with Mbappé receiving a pass from Marcus Thuram before volleying the ball with his right foot as he was falling to the ground to the bottom-right corner of the net to make the game 2–2. Messi had a hard shot parried over the bar by Hugo Lloris near the end of added time, and with the score tied at the end of regulation time, the match went to extra time. 

After the first half of extra time finished without a goal, Messi scored again for Argentina in the second period of extra time when he finished from close range after Lloris had parried a shot from Lautaro Martínez on the right, in what seemed to be the winning goal. However, France was awarded a second penalty in the 118th minute after a shot by Mbappé hit the arm of Gonzalo Montiel. Mbappé scored his third goal with his penalty kick to the left, sending Martínez the wrong way and becoming the second player to score a hat-trick in a men's World Cup final after Geoff Hurst for England in 1966. In the 123rd minute, with 15 seconds of the extra time to spare and with the score tied at 3–3, a loose ball fell to Kolo Muani at the edge of the box, who with no Argentina defender to stop him, shot low to the right of the goal, however, Emiliano Martínez blocked the shot with his left thigh to take the match to a penalty shootout.

This was the third time the World Cup final would be decided on penalties. Mbappé and Messi successfully converted the first two attempts in the penalty shootout, but Kingsley Coman's attempt was saved by Argentina goalkeeper Martínez down low to his right. Paulo Dybala sent a shot into the net up the middle to give Argentina a 2–1 lead. Aurélien Tchouaméni then sent his shot wide of the goal to the left and Leandro Paredes scored to put France on the brink of defeat at 3–1. Kolo Muani kept France alive by scoring his chance, setting up a chance for Montiel to make up for his late handball by clinching the championship for Argentina. Montiel scored low to the left, giving Argentina their third World Cup trophy and first since 1986.

Details

Statistics

Post-match

Pundits, commentators, and audiences praised the intensity, stressful atmosphere, and thrilling back-and-forth nature of the match, highlighting the number of goals scored, and with many media outlets spotlighting it as a duel between Paris Saint-Germain teammates Messi and Mbappé. The match has since been hailed as one of the most exciting World Cup finals, and among the greatest football matches of all time.

With the victory, Argentina won their third FIFA World Cup title to surpass France and Uruguay, their titles ranking behind only Brazil's five and the four of Italy and Germany. They became the first South American and first non-European side to win the World Cup since Brazil in 2002, and the first reigning champions of the Copa América to win the World Cup. Having won on penalties against the Netherlands in the quarter-finals, Argentina became the first team to have won on that method twice en route to the title. It was the tenth World Cup title for a South American side, and the eighth South American victory in eleven finals facing European opposition. France became the third defending champions to lose in the following final, after Argentina in 1990 and Brazil in 1998. The match was the third FIFA World Cup final to be decided by a penalty shoot-out, after 1994 and 2006, the latter of which France also lost to Italy. This meant that France have never won on penalties in all competitions since the 1998 World Cup quarter-final against Italy. The six goals in the final brought the total number of goals in the tournament to a record 172, surpassing the 171 goals scored in 1998 and 2014. 

FIFA president Gianni Infantino was present on the pitch stage during the awards ceremony to hand out the medals and present the trophy to the Argentine captain Lionel Messi. He was joined by Qatari Emir Tamim bin Hamad Al Thani, French president Emmanuel Macron, Argentine Football Association president Claudio Tapia, French Football Federation president Noël Le Graët, CONMEBOL president Alejandro Domínguez and UEFA president Aleksander Čeferin. Sergio Batista and Nery Pumpido, World Cup winners with Argentina in 1986, brought the trophy onto the pitch for the ceremony. Before being presented with the trophy by the Emir and Infantino, Messi was given a bisht to wear by the Emir prior to the trophy celebration. The trophy presentation had scenery unlike previous tournaments, with confetti replaced by pyrotechnics and lights.

Messi was named as the player of the match and won his second Golden Ball award after 2014 as the best player of the tournament, becoming the first (and so far only) player to receive the award twice. He also won the Silver Boot award with the second-most goals at the tournament, seven. Messi's appearance in the final, his 26th World Cup game, meant he surpassed Lothar Matthäus as the player with the most appearances in the World Cup. With his goals, Messi became the second player to score in the round of 16, quarter-finals, semi-finals and final of a World Cup tournament, after Hungary's György Sárosi in 1938, and the only player to score in all of those knockout rounds as well as the group stage. Having scored once in the previous final, Mbappé's hat-trick made him the highest-scoring player in the final of the World Cup with four goals, surpassing the three of Hurst, Pelé, Vavá and Zinedine Zidane. In addition, with his three goals, he surpassed Messi to win the Golden Boot award as the top scorer of the tournament with eight goals, the most in a World Cup since Brazil's Ronaldo in 2002, and also was awarded the Silver Ball as the second-best player of the World Cup. Argentina's Emiliano Martínez won the Golden Glove award as the best goalkeeper of the tournament, while his teammate Enzo Fernández won the Young Player Award as the best player at the World Cup who is at most 21 (born on or after 1 January 2001).

In Argentina, celebrations erupted across the country, most notably in the capital Buenos Aires and in Rosario, Messi's hometown. On 20 December, the celebration in the streets of Buenos Aires after the arrival of the players of Argentina gathered a crowd estimated by local media at over four million people, forcing the team to be airlifted by helicopter out of their bus. On 22 December, the French Football Federation confirmed to have lodged a formal complaint against the Argentine goalkeeper Emiliano Martínez for unsporting behaviour which included incidents such as a sarcastic prayer for silence for French forward Kylian Mbappé in the Argentine locker room after the match, as well as being seen holding and laughing at a toy with a facial cut of Mbappé's face stuck to it during the Argentine victory parade. In France, riots erupted across the country in cities including Paris, Lyon and Nice; these were very similar to those after their victory in 2018, as well as after victories against England and Morocco earlier in the tournament. Some French players like Kingsley Coman, Randal Kolo Muani and Aurélien Tchouaméni were racially abused online due to their performances by their own fans. The racial abuse the French players received was reminiscent of the racial abuse directed at Marcus Rashford, Jadon Sancho and Bukayo Saka after their missed penalty kicks in the UEFA Euro 2020 Final saw Italy win that tournament. Within 48 hours of Messi posting, the Instagram post with the World Cup trophy had surpassed 64 million likes, and in doing so, it became the most-liked social media post ever across all social media platforms surpassing the previous most like Instagram post the World record egg

Notes

References

External links

 

Final
2022
2022–23 in Qatari football
Lusail
Argentina national football team matches
Argentina at the 2022 FIFA World Cup
Argentina–France sports relations
France national football team matches
France at the 2022 FIFA World Cup
FIFA World Cup Final
Association football penalty shoot-outs
Lionel Messi